Eleonora Abbagnato (born 30 June 1978) is an Italian ballet dancer, model, and actress. Between 2013 and 2021 she was Étoile at the Paris Opera Ballet.

Early life and education 

Born in Palermo, Abbagnato started dancing at 4 years old, and at 12 she moved to Monte Carlo to enroll in the dance school of Marika Bresobrasova. At 13, she toured Europe with Roland Petit's The Sleeping Beauty, in the role of Aurora as a child.  She was then admitted, after a private audition, to the École de Danse of the Paris Opera as a fellowship student.

Career
In 1996, at the age of 18, Abbagnato graduated and joined the corps de ballet of the Opera, where she made a rapid ascent: Coryphée in 1999, Sujet in 2000, Premiere Danseuse in 2001 and Étoile in March 2013.

In 2007, Abbagnato debuted as an actress in the film Il 7 e l'8 with Ficarra e Picone.  On 18 February 2009, she joined Paolo Bonolis in hosting the second night of the Sanremo Music Festival.  The same year, she released her autobiography Un angelo sulle punte (An Angel on her toes).

In 2012, she was the subject of a photographic exhibition with pictures by Massimo Gatti that was held in Milan, Los Angeles, London and Miami.

In 2015, Abbagnato was appointed director of the corps de ballet of the Teatro dell'Opera di Roma.

Abbagnato was first set to retire from Paris Opera Ballet after a performance of Le Parc in 2019. However, due to the dancers' strike, her farewell had to be delayed. She then chose to have special performance that features works she danced over the course of her career. The show was scheduled on 18 May 2020. However, due to the COVID-19 pandemic and its impact on the performing arts, the performance was cancelled. She eventually bade her farewell to the stage on 12 June 2021 performing a Hommage a Roland Petit.

Personal life
Abbagnato married football player Federico Balzaretti on 13 June 2011. They have two children. Balzaretti has two children from a previous relationship.

Filmography

References

External links 
MySpace

Living people
Italian film actresses
1978 births
Italian television personalities
Italian ballerinas
Paris Opera Ballet étoiles
Actresses from Palermo
Association footballers' wives and girlfriends
21st-century Italian ballet dancers
21st-century Italian actresses
20th-century Italian ballet dancers